Clarence Stanley Menzies (April 29, 1915 – July 20, 1989) was a Canadian politician. He served in the Legislative Assembly of New Brunswick from 1960 to 1974 as member of the Liberal party.

References

External links

1915 births
1989 deaths
Members of the Legislative Assembly of New Brunswick
New Brunswick Liberal Association MLAs